Charles Ford (August 2, 1931 – September 1, 2021) was an American politician who served in the Oklahoma House of Representatives from 1966 to 1982 and the Oklahoma Senate from 1982 to 2005.

Ford holds the record as the longest serving Republican member of the Oklahoma Legislature. He was the second longest serving member of the Oklahoma Legislature behind Democratic State Senator Gene Stipe.

Ford also served in leadership roles during his tenure such as House minority whip from 1969 to 1970, House minority floor leader from 1971 to 1972, House assistant minority floor leader from 1979 to 1981, and minority leader in the Senate from 1991 to 1992.

References

1931 births
2021 deaths
21st-century American politicians
20th-century American politicians
20th-century Members of the Oklahoma House of Representatives
Republican Party members of the Oklahoma House of Representatives
Republican Party Oklahoma state senators
Politicians from Tulsa, Oklahoma